Norman Miniti (born 23 February 1992) is a Solomon Islands international footballer who plays as a midfielder for Telekom S-League side Real Kakamora.

Career statistics

International

References

1992 births
Living people
Solomon Islands footballers
Solomon Islands international footballers
Association football midfielders